The Progressive Conservative Party of Ontario, often shortened to the Ontario PC Party or simply the PCs, colloquially known as the Tories, is a centre-right political party in Ontario, Canada.

The PC Party has historically embraced Red Toryism and centrism, ideologies that were prominent during their uninterrupted governance from 1943 to 1985; government intervention in the economy was significant and spending on health care and education dramatically increased. In the 1990s, the party underwent a shift to Blue Toryism after the election of Mike Harris as leader, who was premier from 1995 to 2002 and favoured a "Common Sense Revolution" platform of cutting taxes and government spending while balancing the budget through small government. The PCs lost power in 2003 though came back into power with a majority government in 2018 under Doug Ford.

Ideology and principles

Ideology

The Ontario PC Party is a centre-right conservative political party. In recent years, the PC Party has repeatedly campaigned on the following policies:

Economic regulation
 Allowing private retailers to sell alcohol and cannabis
 Streamlining regulations
 Opposing calls to ban licensed firearm ownership

Education
 Adding financial literacy to the curriculum
 Supporting sex-education, but allowing parents to opt-out of it
 Reducing the power of teachers' unions
 Hiring teachers based on merit and qualifications, rather than seniority
 Abolishing the Ontario College of Trades

Healthcare
 Supporting Ontario's universal publically funded healthcare system
 Hiring more healthcare workers
 Allowing privately run healthcare clinics to provide publically funded healthcare procedures

Government spending
 Pursuing balanced budgets during times of economic growth
 Opposing the implementation of a universal basic income and "no strings attached" welfare payments
Reducing corporate welfare

Infrastructure
 Funding the construction of more highways and roads
 Funding the construction of public transit
 De-politicizing the approval proccess for housing construction
 Support the use of hydro electricity and nuclear electricity

Law-enforcement
 Opposing legalization of recreational drugs 
 Hiring more police officers and opposing the police abolition movement
 Pursuing longer prison sentences during prosecutions

Taxation
 Reducing of income taxes
 Reducing of business taxes
 Reducing gasoline taxes and opposing a carbon tax

Other issues
 Reducing the number of politicians in municipal governments

History

Origins 

The first Conservative Party in Upper Canada was made up of United Empire Loyalists and supporters of the wealthy Family Compact that ruled the colony. Once responsible government was granted in response to the 1837 Rebellions, the Tories emerged as moderate reformers who opposed the radical policies of the Reformers and then the Clear Grits.

The modern Conservative Party originated in the Liberal-Conservative coalition founded by Sir John A. Macdonald and George-Étienne Cartier in 1854. It is a variant of this coalition that formed the first government in Ontario with John Sandfield Macdonald as premier.

Until becoming the Progressive Conservatives in 1942, the party was officially known as the "Liberal-Conservative Association of Ontario", reflecting its liberal-conservative origins, but became widely known as the Conservative Party.

Confederation 
John Sandfield Macdonald was actually a Liberal and sat concurrently as a Liberal Party of Canada member of Parliament (MP) in the House of Commons of Canada but he was an ally of John A. Macdonald (though not a relative). His government was initially a true coalition of Liberals and Conservatives under his leadership but soon the more radical Reformers bolted to the opposition and Sandfield Macdonald was left leading what was essentially a conservative coalition that included some Liberals under the Liberal-Conservative banner. After losing power in 1871, this conservative coalition began to dissolve. What was originally a party that included Catholics and Protestants became an almost exclusively English and Protestant party, more and more dependent on the Protestant Orange Order for support, and even for its leadership. The party became opposed to funding for separate (Catholic) schools, opposed to language rights for French-Canadians, and distrustful of immigrants. Paradoxically, an element of the party gained a reputation for being pro-labour as a result of links between the Orange Order and the labour movement.

Pre-war dynasty
After 33 years in Opposition, the Tories returned to power under James P. Whitney, who led a progressive administration in its development of the province. The Whitney government initiated massive public works projects such as the creation of Ontario Hydro. It also enacted reactionary legislation (such as Regulation 17) against the French-Canadian population in Ontario. The Tories were in power for all but five years from 1905 to 1934. After the death of Whitney in 1914, however, they lacked vision and became complacent. The Tories lost power to the United Farmers of Ontario in the 1919 election but were able to regain office in 1923 election due to the UFO's disintegration and divisions in the Ontario Liberal Party. They were defeated by Mitch Hepburn's Liberals in 1934 due to their inability to cope with the Great Depression.

Post-war dynasty
Late in the 1930s and early in the 1940s, the Conservatives re-organized and developed new policies. Rather than continue to oppose government spending and intervention, a policy which hurt the party politically in the time of the Great Depression, the Conservatives changed their policies to support government action where it would lead to economic growth.

The party changed its name to the "Progressive Conservative" party after its federal counterpart changed its name to the Progressive Conservative Party of Canada in December 1942 on the insistence of its new leader, John Bracken, whose roots were in the populist Progressive Party.

The Progressive Conservatives took advantage of Liberal infighting to win a minority government in the 1943 provincial election, reducing the Liberals to third-party status. Drew called another election in 1945, only two years into his mandate, to get a majority government. The PCs played up Cold War tensions to win a landslide majority, though it emerged several years later that the PC government had set up a secret department of the Ontario Provincial Police to spy on the opposition and the media. The PCs would dominate Ontario politics for the next four decades.

Under Drew and his successor, Leslie Frost, the PCs were a strong champion of rural issues but also invested heavily in the development of civil works throughout the province, including the construction of the 400 series of highways, beginning with the 401 across Toronto. In 1961, John Robarts became the 17th premier of Ontario. He was one of the most popular premiers in years. Under Robarts's lead, the party epitomized power. He was an advocate of individual freedoms and promoted the rights of the provinces against what he saw as the centralizing initiatives of the federal government, while also promoting national unity against Quebec separatism. He hosted the 1967 "Confederation of Tomorrow" conference in Toronto in an unsuccessful attempt to achieve an agreement for a new Constitution of Canada.

Robarts opposed Canadian medicare when it was proposed, but later endorsed it fully, and the party implemented the public health care system that continues to this day. He led the party towards a civil libertarian movement. As a strong believer in the promotion of both official languages, he opened the door to French education in Ontario schools.

Big Blue Machine era
In 1971, Bill Davis became party leader and the 18th premier. Anti-Catholicism became an issue again in the 1971 election, when the Tories campaigned strenuously against a Liberal proposal to extend funding for Catholic separate schools until Grade 13. Davis reversed himself in 1985, and enacted the funding extension as one of his last acts before leaving office.

Davis governed until 1985 with a team of advisers known as the "Big Blue Machine" because of their reputed political and strategic skills. Their stamp on the party was so strong that many refer to the Tories' long rule over Ontario as the "Big Blue Machine era".

During Davis's time as leader of the party, the party moved to the centre, and on some issues moved to the left of the Liberals. However, its base of support remained with socially conservative voters in rural Southern Ontario. Davis largely reconciled these differences and emerged one of the most popular politicians in Ontario's history. Other conservatives in the federal PC Party accused him of damaging the conservative image in Canada by moving to the left on some issues. Davis continued the rapid expansion of community colleges, universities, and highways across Ontario.

1980s to 1995: in Opposition

Davis retired in 1985. At a leadership convention, he was succeeded by Industry and Trade Minister Frank Miller. Miller was considerably more conservative than Davis, and began shifting the party back to the right. Soon after taking office, he called an election in which the PCs were reduced to a minority government, and actually finished behind the Liberals in the popular vote for the first time in 42 years.

Soon afterward, the Ontario New Democratic Party (NDP) of Bob Rae reached an agreement with David Peterson's Liberals in which the NDP would support a Liberal minority government. Miller was defeated in a no-confidence motion on June 18. Peterson was asked to form a government later in the day, ending the longest period of one-party rule in Canadian provincial history. Miller was replaced as leader by Larry Grossman at a second leadership convention.

When the Liberal-NDP Accord expired, an election was held in 1987 in which the Tories were reduced to third place in the Legislative Assembly of Ontario. They only won 16 seats, their worst showing in over half a century. Grossman was personally defeated in his downtown Toronto riding and resigned immediately. Andy Brandt was the party's interim leader until a leadership election was held in 1990 in which Mike Harris defeated Dianne Cunningham.

Three months after the election of Harris, and only three years into the, typically, four-year term of the Liberal government, David Peterson called a provincial election, in which the PCs failed to improve their standing, but which resulted in the defeat of the Liberals by Rae's NDP.

Mike Harris and the "Common Sense Revolution"

In the 1995 election, Harris catapulted his party from third place to an election victory, running on a small government platform called the "Common Sense Revolution". The platform promised tax cuts (including 30% cuts to provincial personal income tax), and adopted wedge issues including deficit reduction, welfare cuts, the introduction of workfare, and the repeal of an employment equity law Harris characterized as "the quota law."

Public opinion on the Harris government was polarized. The government was criticized on issues such as health care, the environment, education, and social policies. Strikes and protests including a 1997 teacher's strike beleaguered its first term. But it won a second majority in the 1999 general election, and held generally stable support until Harris's departure as party leader in 2002.

A slide in PC support began in early 2000 according to Ipsos-Reid, when the Tories fell behind the Liberals in the public opinion polls for the first time since the 1999 election, with 36% support of those polled, compared to 42% for the Liberals and 17% for the NDP. Later in 2000, Liberal support rose to about half of those polled, while PC support remained in the low 30s. This pattern held through to the 2002 leadership campaign, when PC support rose to 37%, while the Liberals retained the support of about half of those polled.

Ernie Eves: distancing the party from Harris and 2003 defeat
With the resignation of Mike Harris in 2002, the PCs held a leadership election. Ernie Eves, who had been Harris's minister of finance, and who had the backing of almost all PC members of provincial parliament (MPPs), won the campaign, defeating his successor as minister of finance, Jim Flaherty.

Eves was a Red Tory, unlike Harris. He'd tried to blunt some of the edges of the more radical elements of Harris's platform while in Cabinet. His distancing from the Common Sense Revolution continued after he became premier. He killed plans to sell off Hydro One and re-imposed retail price controls on electricity, capping the price at 4.3 cents per kilowatt-hour, and vowing to keep it capped until at least 2006.

During the summer after Eves's election as leader, the PCs closed the gap in popular support considerably, placing only two percentage points behind the Liberals in two summer public opinion polls. By the autumn of 2002, however, Eves's "honeymoon" with the voters was over, and the party fell back in the polls, hovering in the mid-to-high 30s, while the Liberals scored in the mid-to-high 40s.

Despite his attempt to recast the Tory government as a moderate one, Eves was unable to reverse the slide in the polls the Tories had suffered in the last years of Harris's tenure.

Eves asked Flaherty's campaign chairman, Jaime Watt, to co-manage the PC election campaign, along with the rest of the "Whiz Kids" team that had previously worked for Harris. Only Tom Long, the central organizer in Harris's campaigns, refused to work for Eves.

The "Whiz Kids" reputation for competence was marred by publicity stunts such as handing down his government's second budget at the headquarters of Magna International instead of in the provincial legislature. Voter backlash against this break with parliamentary tradition forced the delay of a planned spring election in 2003.

In May 2003, Eves released the party's platform, "The Road Ahead". The document promoted an aggressive hard-right agenda, and was closer in spirit to Harris and Flaherty's agenda than to Eves's own. In releasing this document, Eves reversed his earlier positions on banning teacher's strikes, jailing the homeless, private school tax credits and same-sex marriage. The platform also called for mortgage interest deductibility.

The PC election campaign was riddled with mistakes and miscues, and Eves appeared uncomfortable trying to sell a platform he had opposed only a year earlier. In contrast, the Liberals had spent the last four years positioning themselves as the government in waiting, and ran on the simple platform of "Choose Change". PC television ads which attacked Liberal leader Dalton McGuinty as "still not up to the job" were received poorly by the voting public, and allowed the Liberal campaign to portray the Tories as needlessly confrontational.

A critical point in the campaign was when a member of the Eves team jokingly referred to McGuinty as an "evil reptilian kitten-eater from another planet", a comment that made the Tories appear desperate to vilify their opponents. In the final days leading up to the vote, Eves was further criticized for saying that McGuinty just says "whatever comes into his pointy little head". On election day, the Tories were routed, falling to 24 seats.

Opposition under John Tory (2004 to 2009)

In early 2004, Eves announced his intention to step down as leader. A leadership convention to replace him was called for the fall.

Jim Flaherty was the first to enter the race, campaigning on the same right wing platform as in 2002. He was soon opposed by John Tory, a former executive with Rogers Cable and a Toronto mayoral candidate in 2003 (a position he would ultimately win in 2014), sometimes viewed as a Red Tory due to his association to former premier Bill Davis. MPP Frank Klees, the third candidate in the race, was a supporter of the Common Sense Revolution and campaigned for a parallel private health care system.

The 2004 leadership election was held on September 18, 2004, electing John Tory as the party's new leader. Tory, who had first worked as an aide to Premier Bill Davis, was elected to the Ontario legislature in a by-election in March, 2005, in the seat that Eves held.

In polling prior to the 2007 general election, the PCs' support rose after the first Liberal budget in 2004. The party was virtually tied with the Liberals, as Tory has experimented with several different orientations. During his first year as leader, Tory attempted to rise above partisan politics, openly contemptuous of partisan moves and pledging to improve decorum in the legislature. In his second year as leader, Tory adopted a more traditional approach to the issues, sharply opposing the Liberal plans on taxes, spending, deficits and cuts. Heading into the election year, Tory put most of his emphasis on criticizing the government's handling of a standoff with Mohawk aboriginals in Caledonia in order to portray the government as weak. He also emphasized traditional right-wing issues like taxes, crime and government spending.

During the 2006 PC Policy Convention, Tory introduced his plan for shaping up the PCs' platform for the 2007 election campaign. His ideas were stated in what have been called "The White Papers".

The party experienced a drop in popularity, however, after Tory pledged to provide government funding for faith-based schools. The proposal, which proved to be unpopular with voters, contributed largely to the party's loss. The Liberals won a second majority government, and the PCs made negligible gains in the legislature (one more seat, but a 3 per cent drop in the popular vote). Tory, who had left his Dufferin–Peel–Wellington–Grey seat to run in Don Valley West, would lose to Liberal incumbent Kathleen Wynne.

2008 party convention and the leadership review question

As a result of the election loss, the party decided to hold a leadership review vote at its 2008 General Party Meeting in London. The Ontario PC Party's constitution requires that the party hold a leadership review vote at the first party convention after an election defeat.

From the election day until the 2008 General Meeting, party members were divided into two "camps": those who supported John Tory's position as party leader and those who opposed his leadership. Several campaigns to oust John Tory as leader of the party, most notably by a party activist group led by former party president Rueben Devlin called Grassroots PC. John Tory had the public support of the PC legislative caucus, and most notably, support from former premiers and predecessors Ernie Eves and Bill Davis.

The lead-up to the review vote was marked by high emotions on both sides of the debate and allegations of rule breaking. Such allegations were risen when caucus members sent letters on party letterhead seeking support for Tory. The letters signed by Tory MPPs Bob Runciman and Toby Barrett were a clear violation of the rules of the party, as the party in general is supposed to be neutral on the leadership review question. Tory responded by stating that he and his supporters will reimburse the party for the letters that the caucus members had sent in support of Tory's position as leaders. As a result, the party's president, Blair McCreadie, had stated that the matter is closed. A supporter of Tory's, PC Youth President Andrew Brander, launched a series of last-minute challenges of delegates on the grounds that they are representing ridings where they neither live nor work.

Tory received 66.9% support, lower than internal tracking which showed him more comfortably in the 70 per cent range - appeared to come as a shock to Tory. The percentage of support received by Tory was nearly identical to Joe Clark's 1983 support when he was federal PC leader, which resulted in Clark resigning as leader, and is often seen as the benchmark for Canadian party leaders to get to stay on as leader.

Three hours after the leadership review vote, John Tory announced to the delegates at the Ontario PC's general meeting that he would stay on as leader of the Party. Tory came under heavy criticism from several party members following this delay, with his opponents signalling that they would continue to call for an end to what they called his 'weak' leadership. Other party members, such as former Mike Harris's chief of staff Guy Giorno and interim leader of the opposition Bob Runciman, supported John Tory, saying that his opponents should accept the results and move on.

Opposition under Tim Hudak (2009 to 2014)

John Tory announced his pending resignation as leader on March 6, 2009; the day following his defeat in a by-election for Haliburton—Kawartha Lakes—Brock. On June 27, 2009, party members elected Tim Hudak as the party's new leader. Christine Elliott, Frank Klees, and Randy Hillier were the unsuccessful candidates.

Hudak led the PCs through two elections. In the 2011 provincial election, the McGuinty Liberal government was reduced to a minority. Hudak's Tories were widely expected to win the 2014 provincial election but the Liberals, now led by Kathleen Wynne, were returned with a majority government largely due to Hudak's campaign pledge to cut 100,000 public service jobs by attrition rather than by layoffs. Hudak resigned in the aftermath. On July 2, 2014, Jim Wilson was chosen by the Progressive Conservative caucus to be its interim leader until the 2015 leadership election.

Opposition under Patrick Brown (2015 to 2018)

On May 9, 2015, the membership elected Patrick Brown, a federal Conservative MP from Barrie, as the leader of the party. Christine Elliott was the unsuccessful candidate with Vic Fedeli, Lisa MacLeod, and Monte McNaughton withdrawing prior to the vote.

Since he did not hold a seat in the Legislature, the party requested that MPP Garfield Dunlop resign his seat in Simcoe North so that Brown could run. Brown was elected as MPP for Simcoe North in a by-election held September 3, 2015.

At the party's 2016 Annual General Meeting (the first since the leadership election) Brown announced that the PCs would take on a more inclusive and compassionate tone, shifting to the political centre by reach out to groups that do not typically support the party including trade unions, and pursue "sensible" carbon pricing. He also unveiled a new logo to represent the commitment to "inclusion, renewal, openness and change". Brown stated his intention to change the party by moving away from past campaigns where one particular issue often cost them support, such as Tim Hudak's proposed public sector job cuts in the 2014 election or John Tory's proposal to extend public funding to all faith-based schools in 2007.

At the PC's weekend policy convention on November 25, 2017, their "People's Guarantee" platform was released. Brown's platform was described as centrist on many issues, and included proposals such as opting-in to the federal carbon tax "backstop" (while criticizing the Liberal's cap-and-trade system) and providing child care subsidies. Brown's platform also included more traditional PC platform items relating to cutting taxes and user fees, such as a 12 percent reduction in hydro bills, cutting "middle-class taxes by 22 per cent", and a commitment to balancing the provincial budget. Brown also attempted to distance himself from socially conservative policies, declaring himself pro-choice, and refusing to discuss abortion and gay marriage issues at the policy convention, stating that he believed the "vast majority" of the party was on board with socially progressive policies.

Led by the Campaign Life Coalition, a socially conservative anti-abortion organization that had supported Brown's leadership bid and disapproved of his move to the centre a breakaway party called "Ontario Alliance" was formed to represent disaffected social conservatives. Similarly, the Trillium Party of Ontario aimed to represent conservative libertarians who have been left out. In particular, Brown expelled Carleton—Mississippi Mills MPP and former Ontario Land Association president Jack MacLaren out of the party after he made negative disparaging comments about Francophone language rights. MacLaren subsequently crossed the floor to become the Trillium Party's first member in the Ontario Legislature. As well, some conservatives in Northern Ontario who have felt unrepresented by the Tories and alienated by the party leadership have joined the Northern Ontario Party.

On January 24, 2018, Brown was accused by two women of engaging in sexual misconduct. Brown denied the allegations and initially refused to step down. After pressure from within the party caucus, including calls for his resignation by deputy PC leaders Sylvia Jones and Steve Clark, he resigned as leader in the early hours of January 25, with some aspects of the allegations later proving to be false or unconfirmed.

Transition under Vic Fedeli (January to March 2018)

With Brown's resignation occurring less than five months before the next provincial election, the party executive met on January 25, 2018 to determine whether to have the next Progressive Conservative Party of Ontario leadership election before the provincial election, and if so how it will proceed, or whether to have the interim leader lead the party into the election. Vic Fedeli, Nipissing MPP and former mayor of North Bay, was chosen as interim leader by caucus on January 26, 2018. The Party held a leadership convention on March 10, 2018.

Fedeli's first major task as interim leader was to investigate the allegations of questionable spending on lawsuits and unsubstantiated favours to allies during Brown's tenure. Party president Rick Dykstra resigned on January 28, 2018. He indicated that it was time for "someone else to lead us through the hard work". Shortly afterwards, Maclean's magazine revealed allegations of sexual assault against Dykstra, stemming from a 2014 incident when Dykstra was a federal MP. Several other key party and campaign staffers were dismissed or their positions eliminated  due to a "reorganization" in the days after Brown's resignation.

Doug Ford leadership (March 2018 to present) 

On March 10, 2018, Doug Ford, former Toronto city councillor, the brother of the late former mayor of Toronto Rob Ford and son of the late former MPP Doug Ford Sr., was elected as leader of the PC Party, narrowly defeating runner-up Christine Elliott on the third ballot with 50.6% of allocated points, although Elliot had more votes. Due to not having a seat in the legislature, Ford chose to have Vic Fedeli remain as leader of the opposition prior to the 2018 election.

On June 7, 2018, Ford led the PCs to a majority government. The Tories won 76 of 124 seats and 40.5% of the vote.

In the 2022 Ontario general election, Ford led the PCs to another victory winning with an increased majority.

Party leaders

The party was known as the Liberal-Conservative Association of Ontario from 1867 to 1942, and then as the Progressive Conservative Party of Ontario from 1942 to present.

Party presidents

Election results

See also

Official Opposition Shadow Cabinet of the 40th Legislative Assembly of Ontario
List of Ontario general elections
List of premiers of Ontario
List of leaders of the opposition in Ontario
List of political parties in Canada
List of political parties in Ontario
Ontario PC Youth Association
Ontario PC Campus Association

Notes

References

External links

 
Anti-Catholic organizations
1854 establishments in Ontario
Conservative parties in Canada
Organizations based in Toronto
Political parties established in 1854
Populist parties
Provincial political parties in Ontario
Right-wing populism in Canada